The rosefin rasbora (Rasbora dusonensis) is a species of ray-finned fish in the genus Rasbora from Southeast Asia.

References 

Rasboras
Freshwater fish of China
Freshwater fish of Indonesia
Freshwater fish of Malaysia
Fish of the Mekong Basin
Fish of Cambodia
Fish of Laos
Fish of Singapore
Fish of Thailand
Fish of Vietnam
Freshwater fish of Borneo
Fauna of Sumatra
Taxa named by Pieter Bleeker
Fish described in 1850